The Ivanna Eudora Kean High School, is one of the  public high school located on the island of St. Thomas in the United States Virgin Islands. It serves students that live in what is colloquially called the "country" or countryside area of the island of St. Thomas. The country designation refers to the East End, a portion of the Southside and Northside districts, and the Tutu District. I.E.K.H.S. also serves the student population on the island of St. John because it lacks a public high school.

While The Devil Rays compete against the Antilles Hurricanes, All-Saints Vikings, Saints Peter and Paul Jaguars, The Virgin Islands Montessori School Volts, Seventh Day Adventist Crusaders, and The Wesleyan Academy in the St. Thomas / St John District, they hold a long-standing and intense rivalry with the Charlotte Amalie High School Chickenhawks.

History
It was established in 1971 as the Nazareth Bay Secondary School serving as a junior high and senior high school. In 1973, it became a senior high school with the construction of Bertha C. Boschulte Middle School. Its first graduation was also held in that same year. In 1975, it was renamed the Ivanna Eudora Kean High School to honor Ivanna Eudora Kean, an educator in the Virgin Islands for 52 years. The school's namesake died on February 27, 1979. Dr. Sharon McCollum served as principal of the school since August 2003 until 2014 when she accepted the position of Commissioner of Education under Governor Kenneth E. Mapp and Lt. Governor Osbert E.Potter Administration.  Ms. Sally F. Petty assumed the Acting Principal's position for 6 months until Mr. Stefan V. Jürgen was placed as the Principal in the 2015-16 school year.

References

High schools in the United States Virgin Islands
St. Thomas-St. John School District
Educational institutions established in 1971
1971 establishments in the United States Virgin Islands
East End, Saint Thomas, U.S. Virgin Islands